Adamit is a kibbutz in northern Israel. Located in the western Galilee in Israel near the border with Lebanon, it falls under the jurisdiction of Mateh Asher Regional Council.

History
Kibbutz Adamit was founded in August 1958 by members of Hashomer Hatzair, and was named after a Second Temple period town whose ruins were found in the area. The kibbutz was founded on the land of the depopulated Palestinian village of Khirbat Iribbin, to the west of the village site. In 1967, the kibbutz was abandoned, and only Nahal groups remained. In 1971, the kibbutz was resettled by new immigrants from England, United States and Canada, after a year of training at kibbutz Mishmar HaEmek. During the 1980s, the kibbutz suffering from financial problems and was put under administrative receivership. Since the 1990s, a new build-your-own-home neighborhood has been developed along the hillside.

Geography and climate

The kibbutz is situated on a hill, offering a panoramic view of the Galilee. On one side lies the Nahal Betzet nature reserve, and to the north, Nahal Namer. The region receives 750 millimeters of rainfall per annum, which is relatively high for Israel.

Economy
The kibbutz operates a chicken coop, orchards and a metalwork factory. It also rents out vacation cabins to tourists.

References

Kibbutzim
Kibbutz Movement
Populated places established in 1958
1958 establishments in Israel
Populated places in Northern District (Israel)